The Poet's Windfall is a 1918 British silent drama film directed by Henry Edwards and starring Edwards, John MacAndrews, and Chrissie White.

Cast
 Henry Edwards as The Poet
 John MacAndrews as The Man
 Chrissie White as The Girl

References

External links

1918 films
British silent short films
1918 drama films
Films directed by Henry Edwards
British drama films
British black-and-white films
1910s English-language films
1910s British films
Silent drama films